Alessandro Haber (born 19 January 1947) is an Italian actor, film director and singer.

Haber was born in Bologna in a Jewish family of mixed ancestry (his father was a Romanian Jew and his mother Italian) and spent his childhood in Israel. His movie debut was in 1967 with La Cina è vicina by Marco Bellocchio. His first leading role was in Pupi Avati's Regalo di Natale.

Haber directed his only movie in 2003 with Scacco pazzo.

He is also a distinguished theatre actor, having performed amongst others in Orgia by Pier Paolo Pasolini, Woyzeck by Georg Büchner, L'avaro by Molière, Zio Vania by Anton Chekhov, Dialogo by Natalia Ginzburg and Arlecchino by Carlo Goldoni.

He has been touring theatres since 2006 with Tango d'amore e di coltelli, with music by Ástor Piazzolla, based on a text by Jorge Luis Borges.

He has won three Nastro d'Argento, one David di Donatello, one Premio Gassman, one Premio IDI and one theatre critics' award. In 2021, the actor was also awarded the Special Nastro d'Argento 2021.

As a singer, he has released three albums: Haberrante, Qualcosa da dichiarare and Il sogno di un uomo. His greatest success was the single "La valigia dell'attore", written for him by Francesco De Gregori.

In June 2011 Haber attempted to kiss actress Lucia Lavia onstage during a rehearsal for Othello at the Teatro Romano di Verona. She responded by slapping him and he immediately slapped her back while accusing her of being "cold." After the intervention of both their lawyers, the theater forced Haber to leave the production and he was replaced by Franco Branciaroli.

In 2017 he has interpreted  Gabriele Tinti's poetry giving voice to the masterpieces in the National Archaeological Museum, Naples and in the Capitoline Museums.

Select filmography

As an actor

1967 - La Cina è vicina
1970 - The Conformist
1971 - Eneide
1971 - Lover of the Great Bear 
1972 - Chi l'ha vista morire?
1975 - Cagliostro
1976 - Come una rosa al naso
1978 - Duri a morire
1981 - Sogni d'oro
1981 - Piso pisello
1982 - Amici miei atto II
1982 - Ehrengard
1983 - Fantozzi subisce ancora
1983 - Flirt
1983 - Dream of a Summer Night 
1985 - Le due vite di Mattia Pascal
1986 - Regalo di Natale
1986 - Grandi Magazzini
1987 - Da grande
1987 - Man on Fire
1988 - Il volpone
1989 - Willy Signori e vengo da lontano
1989 - The Story of Boys & Girls
1991 - Les secrets professionnels du Dr Apfelglück
1992 - Parenti serpenti
1993 - Pacco, doppio pacco e contropaccotto
1993 - Per amore, solo per amore
1994 - La vera vita di Antonio H.
1995 - Men Men Men
1995 - Il cielo è sempre più blu
1995 - I laureati
1996 - The Cyclone
1996 - Return to Home Gori
1997 - Fireworks
1998 - Simpatici & antipatici
1998 - L'ultimo Capodanno
1999 - Dirty Linen
1999 - Falkehjerte
2002 - Un viaggio chiamato amore
2003 - Scacco pazzo
2003 - Suddenly Paradise
2004 - La rivincita di Natale
2006 - La sconosciuta
2006 - Le rose del deserto
2007 - Peopling the Palaces at Venaria Reale
2008 - Albakiara
2008 - Sandrine in the Rain  
2011 - The Cardboard Village
2012 - Il sogno del maratoneta
2018 - As Needed
2018 - Youtopia
2018 - The King's Musketeers
2019 - Il signor Diavolo
2021 - Lei mi parla ancora

As a director
2003: Scacco pazzo

Discography
1995: Haberrante
1999: Qualcosa da dichiarare
2003: Il sogno di un uomo

Awards
Premio IDI (best actor) 1980 (Dialogo)
Nastro d'Argento (best supporting actor) 1990 (Willy Signori e vengo da lontano)
Nastro d'Argento (best supporting actor) 1994 (Per amore, solo per amore)
David di Donatello (best supporting actor) 1994 (Per amore, solo per amore)
Nastro d'Argento (best actor) 1995 (La vera vita di Antonio H.)
Theatre critics' award 1996 (Arlecchino)
Premio Gassman (best theatre actor) 2006 (Zio Vania)

References

External links

 

1947 births
Living people
Italian male film actors
Italian male stage actors
Italian male singer-songwriters
Italian singer-songwriters
Italian film directors
20th-century Italian Jews
Italian people of Romanian descent
Italian expatriates in Israel
Actors from Bologna
David di Donatello winners
Nastro d'Argento winners